The Syrian film industry produced over fifteen feature films in 2014. This article fully lists all non-pornographic films, including short films, that had a release date in that year and which were at least partly made by Syria. It does not include films first released in previous years that had release dates in 2014.  Also included is an overview of the major events in Syrian film, including film festivals and awards ceremonies, as well as lists of those films that have been particularly well received, both critically and financially.

Major releases

Minor releases

See also

 2014 in film
 2014 in Syria
 Cinema of Syria

References

External links

Syrian
Films

Syria